In project management, scope statements can take many forms depending on the type of project being implemented and the nature of the organization. The scope statement details the project deliverables and describes the major objectives. The objectives should include measurable success criteria for the project.

Overview
A scope statement should be written before the statement of work and it should capture, in very broad terms, the product of the project (e.g., "developing a software based system to capture and track orders for software"). A scope statement should also include the list of users using the product, as well as the features in the resulting product.

Contents
As a baseline scope statements should contain:

The project charter
The project owner, sponsors, and stakeholders
The problem statement
The project goals and objectives
The project requirements
The project deliverables
The project non-goals (what is out of scope)
Milestones
Cost estimates

In more project oriented organizations the scope statement could also contain these and other sections:

Project scope management plan
Approved change requests
Project assumptions and risks
Project acceptance criteria

The Project Management Institute (PMI) defines the project scope statement to include

the description of the project scope,
major deliverables,
assumptions, and
constraints.

and is part of the project scope baseline.

See also

 Scope (project management)

References

Project management
Statements